Avon Cities Skiffle Group featuring Ray Bush were founded in Bristol, England, during 1952 by members of the Avon Cities Jazz Band. The group became a part of the skiffle craze that swept the UK in 1957 and made several recordings and appeared on BBC Light Programme shows. Their big hit was named "Green Corn", originally by Lead Belly, an American blues singer and twelve-string guitar player. The Skiffle Group stopped playing skiffle in the mid 1960s, continuing to play jazz for the Jazz Band.

Group
 Ray Bush - Vocals
 Mike Hitchins - Mandolin
 Geoff Nichols - Bass
 Wayne Chandler - Banjo
 Basil Wright - Drums

Musical groups from Bristol
Skiffle groups